Lari may refer to:

Currency 
 Georgian lari, the currency of Georgia
 Maldivian laari, or lari, a coin denomination of the rufiyaa of the Maldives

Places 
Lari, Ardabil, or Lahrud, a city in Iran
Lari, East Azerbaijan, a village in Iran
Lari, Tuscany, a hamlet in Italy
Lari Constituency, an electoral constituency in Kenya
Lari River, Costa Rica

Persons with the name 
Lari (surname)
Lari (given name)

Other uses 
Lari (bird), suborder of birds
Lari language (disambiguation), several languages with the name
Lari people (Congo), an ethnic group in the Republic of the Congo
Lari people (Iran), an ethnic group in Iran
Iraqi Biradari or Lari, Muslim community of India

See also 
Laari (disambiguation)
Larry (disambiguation)
Lare (disambiguation)
Laree (disambiguation)
Lar (disambiguation)
Luri (disambiguation)
Lares, in Roman mythology